The 2005 Pan American Judo Championships was held in Coliseo Solá Besarez in Caguas, Puerto Rico from 19 May to 20 May 2005.

Medal overview

Men's events

Women's events

Medals table

External links
 
 PJU (Official results, 1st day)
 PJU (Official results, 2nd day)

American Championships
Judo
2005
Judo competitions in Puerto Rico
International sports competitions hosted by Puerto Rico